Cochemiea multidigitata is a species of flowering plant in the family Cactaceae that is endemic to San Pedro Nolasco Island in Mexico, growing on steep slopes. Cochemiea multidigitata sprouts a white to cream-colored flower from spring to early summer.

Gallery

References

External links 
 IPNI Listing
 
 Kew Plant List

multidigita
Plants described in 1947